Marcel Sieberg (born 30 April 1982 in Castrop-Rauxel, North Rhine-Westphalia) is a German former road racing cyclist, who last rode for UCI WorldTeam . He turned professional in 2005. He competed in the Tour de France a total of nine times. For the majority of his career, he was one of André Greipel's lead-out men, having been teammates at both  (2008–2010) and then later  (2011–2018). In that role he assisted Greipel to over 100 race wins. He played a role in Bauhaus' stage wins at the 2020 Tour of Saudi Arabia and the 2021 Tour de Hongrie. In June 2021, his team announced that he would retire at the end of the season.

Major results

1998
 1st  Road race, National Junior Road Championships
 1st Stage 2 Critérium Européens des Jeunes
2000
 1st  Road race, National Junior Road Championships
 1st  Overall Trofeo Karlsberg
 1st  Overall Driedaagse van Axel
 1st Overall Giro di Basilicata
 7th Road race, UCI Junior Road World Championships
2001
 Tour de Berlin
1st Stages 1 & 4
 6th Road race, UEC European Under-23 Road Championships
2002
 1st Stage 5 Tour de Berlin
 9th Overall Le Triptyque des Monts et Châteaux
2003
 1st Dortmund-Wellinghofen
 5th Eschborn–Frankfurt Under–23
2004
 4th Overall Tour of South China Sea
1st Stage 3
2005
 1st Ronde van Drenthe
 2nd Sparkassen Giro Bochum
 2nd Omloop van het Houtland
 4th Tour de Rijke
 4th Delta Profronde
 5th Rund um die Nürnberger Altstadt
 6th Omloop der Kempen
 6th Grote Prijs Stad Zottegem
 7th Ronde van Overijssel
 9th Grand Prix Pino Cerami
2006
 1st Grote Prijs Jef Scherens
 3rd Münsterland Giro
 5th Schaal Sels-Merksem
 6th Overall Driedaagse van West-Vlaanderen
 7th Sparkassen Giro Bochum
 10th Overall Four Days of Dunkirk
2007
 2nd Kuurne–Brussels–Kuurne
 4th Trofeo Cala Millor
 4th Münsterland Giro
2008
 2nd Profronde van Fryslan
 3rd Sparkassen Giro Bochum
 7th Neuseen Classics
2009
 3rd Trofeo Calvia
2010
 5th Omloop Het Nieuwsblad
 6th Grand Prix d'Isbergues
2011
 7th Grote Prijs Jef Scherens
2013
 4th Grote Prijs Jef Scherens
 7th Overall Ster ZLM Toer
2014
 6th Overall Tour of Qatar
2015
 5th Münsterland Giro
2016
 3rd Grote Prijs Stad Zottegem
 7th Paris–Roubaix
2018
 7th Heistse Pijl

Grand Tour results timeline

References

External links

1982 births
Living people
People from Castrop-Rauxel
Sportspeople from Münster (region)
German male cyclists
Cyclists at the 2012 Summer Olympics
Olympic cyclists of Germany
Cyclists from North Rhine-Westphalia
21st-century German people